Colby is a surname.

Notable people with the surname "Colby" include

A
Abram Colby, American slave
Anita Colby (1914–1972), American actress
Anthony Colby (1792–1873), American politician

B
Bainbridge Colby (1869–1950), American politician
Barbara Colby (1940–1975), American actress
Brandon Colby, American physician

C
Carlos W. Colby (1837–1922), American soldier
Casey Colby (born 1974), American ski jumper
C. B. Colby (1904–1977), American author
Charles Carroll Colby (1827–1907), Canadian politician
Chuck Colby, American electronics engineer
Clara Bewick Colby (1846–1916), British-American lecturer

D
Danielle Colby (born 1975), American television personality

E
Everett Colby (1874–1943), American politician

F
Flick Colby (1946–2011), American dancer
Frank Moore Colby (1865–1925), American educator and writer
Frederick Myron Colby (1848–1920), American writer

G
Gardner Colby (1810–1879), American businessman
Geoffrey Colby (1901–1958), British colonial administrator
Gerard Colby (born 1950), American author
Greg Colby (born 1952), American football coach
Griffin Colby (born 1992), South African rugby league footballer

H
H. Maria George Colby (1844–1910), American journalist

J
James Colby (1961–2018), American actor
Jamie Colby, American television presenter
John Colby (1787–1813), American preacher
John Colby (musician) (born 1949), American musician
Joseph W. Colby (1854–1916), American pilot
June Rose Colby (1856–1941), American professor

K
Kate Colby (born 1974), American poet
Kenneth Colby (1920–2001), American psychiatrist

L
Leonard Wright Colby (1846–1924), American politician

M
Max Colby (born 1990), American artist
Michael Colby (born 1951), American lyricist
Moses French Colby (1795–1863), Canadian doctor

R
Robert Colby (1922–1987), American songwriter

S
Sasha Colby (born 1985), American drag performer
Stoddard B. Colby (1816–1867), American lawyer

T
Thomas Colby (disambiguation), multiple people

V
Vine Colby (1886–1971), American essayist

W
William Colby (1920–1996), American intelligence officer
William Edward Colby (1865–1974), American lawyer and conservationist

Fictional people
Alexis Colby, a character on the soap operas Dynasty and The Colbys
Jeff Colby, a character on the soap operas Dynasty and The Colbys
Liza Colby, a character on the soap opera, All My Children
Monica Colby, a character on the soap operas Dynasty and The Colbys
Sable Colby, a character on the soap operas Dynasty and The Colbys

See also
Colby (disambiguation), a disambiguation page for "Colby"
Colby (given name), a page for people with the given name "Colby"
General Colby (disambiguation), a disambiguation page for Generals with the surname "Colby"
Governor Colby (disambiguation), a disambiguation page for Governors with the surname "Colby"
Senator Colby (disambiguation), a disambiguation page for Senators with the surname "Colby"